Veeraswami Ramaswami was a judge of the Supreme Court of India and the first judge against whom removal proceedings were initiated in independent India.

Early life and education 
Ramaswami was born in July 1927. His age was moved back by 2 years according to accounts from his late father in law Justice K Veeraswami, who was the former Chief Justice of the Madras High Court, and forged documents indicating February 15, 1929 as his birth date. In reality Ramaswami was born in 1927.  He spent his school years in Hindu High School in Srivilliputhur. He was educated in The American College in Madurai and received a degree in Law from Madras Law College.

Professional career 
He began his career by practising both civil and criminal law at the Madras High Court. He was appointed permanent Judge of the Madras High Court from 31 January 1971. He was later transferred and appointed Chief Justice of Punjab and Haryana High Court on 12 November 1987. At the height of his career, he was appointed Judge of the Supreme Court on 6 October 1989 from which he retired on 14 February 1994.

Removal proceedings

Investigation
A scandal surfaced in the middle of the year 1990 when several media outlets reported about his ostentatious expenditure on his official residence during his tenure as a Chief Justice of Punjab and Haryana. In a serious turn of events, on 1 February 1991, Supreme Court Bar Assn passed a resolution calling for his removal and requesting Chief justice not assign him any further legal work. Bharatiya Janata Party and Left parties submitted a notice of motion to the Indian Parliament seeking his removal from office.

Accepting the motion on 12 March 1991, Speaker Rabi Ray constituted a committee composed of Justice P B Sawant of the Supreme Court, Chief Justice Prabodh Dinkarrao Desai of the Bombay High Court, and Justice O Chinnappa Reddy, retired judge of the Supreme Court to investigate the affair. The committee found Ramaswami guilty of 11 out of 14 charges.

Removal motion in the Lok Sabha (failed)
The removal motion was placed in the Lok Sabha for debate and voting on 10 May 1993. Well known lawyer and a Congress politician Kapil Sibal was his defence lawyer. Of 401 members present in the Lok Sabha that day, there were 196 votes for removal and no votes against and 205 abstentions by ruling Congress and its allies. The motion which requires two-thirds majority of members present and voting of that house and an absolute majority of its total membership of that house thus failed to pass.

The said decision was challenged before the Supreme Court and they upheld the decision of the Parliament.

1999 Lok Sabha election 
He contested from Sivakasi constituency as an Anna Dravida Munnetra Kazhagam (ADMK) candidate in 1999 election against Vaiko from Marumalarchi Dravida Munnetra Kazhagam. Thamaraikani from ADMK who was expelled from the party contested as an independent. He lost the election to Vaiko though he secured 32.21% of the votes. Vaiko received 41.8% and Thamaraikani 4.74% of the votes.

Personal life 
Ramaswami has 5 children.  His youngest son Sanjay Ramaswami is a lawyer and former member of the legislative assembly in Tamil Nadu, representing the Congress party.  Public and private accounts from Justice Fathima Beevi, former Judge of the Supreme Court and former Governor of Tamil Nadu have indicated Ramaswami's interest in elevating Sanjay Ramaswami to a Judge of the Madras High Court, for which she recounts refusing on multiple occasions citing incompetence of Sanjay Ramaswami.  

Ramaswami's other children reside outside of India.  His net worth is estimated to be 60 Crore Indian Rupees.  The source of his wealth is land gifted to him by his father in law which has appreciated in value and other ill-gotten property acquired during his tenure as a Judge.

See also 
 P. D. Dinakaran - former High Court Chief Justice against whom Parliament initiated removal proceedings.
 Soumitra Sen - former Calcutta High Court judge who became the first judge in Independent India to be removed by Rajya Sabha.

References 

Justices of the Supreme Court of India
1929 births
Living people
People from Virudhunagar district
Judges of the Madras High Court
Chief Justices of the Punjab and Haryana High Court
20th-century Indian judges